"Sweet Dream" is a song recorded by Canadian singer and songwriter Alessia Cara. The song was released on July 15, 2021, as the lead single from her third studio album In the Meantime, alongside the promotional single "Shapeshifter". Cara has stated that the song is about her struggles with insomnia.

Background and release 
Cara began to tease the song on June 28, 2021, before officially announcing the release on July 2, 2021.

Critical reception 
Louis Pavlakos of Complex named "Sweet Dream" as the twenty-seventh best Canadian song of 2021, saying "Though the track sounds uplifting and even outright happy at times, Cara just wants to sleep, something we could all use a little bit more of".

Live performances 
The song was performed by Cara from Niagara Falls on The Late Show with Stephen Colbert on July 19, 2021. She also performed "Shapeshifter" on the same day. "Sweet Dream" was then performed on Live with Kelly and Ryan.

Track listing 
Digital download
"Sweet Dream" – 3:01

Digital download – Lullaby Version
"Sweet Dream Lullaby" (Vocal Mix) – 3:15
"Sweet Dream Lullaby" (Piano Mix) – 3:32
"Sweet Dream Lullaby" (Instrumental) – 3:14

Digital download – Sweet Dream - EP
"Sweet Dream" – 3:01
"Sweet Dream Lullaby" (Vocal Mix) – 3:15
"Sweet Dream Lullaby" (Piano Mix) – 3:32
"Sweet Dream Lullaby" (Instrumental) – 3:14

Charts

Release history

References 

2021 singles
2021 songs
Alessia Cara songs
Def Jam Recordings singles
EMI Records singles
Songs written by Alessia Cara